Konstantinos Prousalis (born 6 October 1980) is a Greek male volleyball player. He was part of the Greece men's national volleyball team. He competed with the national team at the 2004 Summer Olympics in Athens, Greece.

See also
 Greece at the 2004 Summer Olympics

References

External links
profile at greekvolley.gr

1980 births
Living people
Greek men's volleyball players
Place of birth missing (living people)
Volleyball players at the 2004 Summer Olympics
Olympic volleyball players of Greece
Olympiacos S.C. players
PAOK V.C. players
E.A. Patras players
Aris V.C. players
Sportspeople from Naousa, Imathia